The men's 4x400 metres relay event at the 2002 World Junior Championships in Athletics was held in Kingston, Jamaica, at National Stadium on 20 and 21 July.

Medalists

Results

Final
21 July

Heats
20 July

Heat 1

Heat 2

Participation
According to an unofficial count, 63 athletes from 15 countries participated in the event.

References

4 x 400 metres relay
Relays at the World Athletics U20 Championships